Laccophilus ellipticus, is a species of predaceous diving beetle widespread in India, Myanmar, Sri Lanka, China, Cambodia, Indonesia, Thailand, and Vietnam.

References 

Dytiscidae
Insects of Sri Lanka
Insects described in 1889